Frank Goldschmidt (born 11 June 1900, date of death unknown) was a South African cricketer. He played in ten first-class matches for Border from 1920/21 to 1929/30.

See also
 List of Border representative cricketers

References

External links
 

1900 births
Year of death missing
South African cricketers
Border cricketers
Cricketers from East London, Eastern Cape